Dowdy is a surname. Notable people with the surname include:

 Adam Dowdy (born 1975), American baseball umpire
 Bill Dowdy (born 1933), American musician
 Cecil Dowdy (1945–2002), American football player
 Helen Dowdy, American actress
 Homer Dowdy (1922–2002), American writer
 John Dowdy (1912–1995), American politician
 Kyle Dowdy (born 1993), American baseball player
 Nancy M. Dowdy, American nuclear physicist
 Wayne Dowdy (born 1943), American politician

See also 
 Dowdy–Ficklen Stadium, named after Ronald and Mary Ellen Dowdy